Košarkarski klub Portorož, commonly referred to as KK Portorož or simply Portorož, is a Slovenian basketball club based in Portorož. The club was founded in 1992.

Honours
Slovenian Second League
Winners: 2012–13

External links
Official website 
Eurobasket.com Team Profile

Basketball teams established in 1992
Basketball teams in Slovenia
1992 establishments in Slovenia